The 2002–03 Bosnia and Herzegovina Hockey League season was the first season of Bosnia and Herzegovina's hockey league, and represents the return of competitive hockey in Bosnia after the dissolution of the Yugoslav Ice Hockey League.

League business
The 2002–03 season is the first season of the Bosnia and Herzegovina Hockey League. Four teams entered the season. HK Bosna which was formed in 1980 played in their first league competition since the 1987–88 Yugoslav Ice Hockey League season. The three other teams were formed in 2002. HK Ilidža 2010 was based in Ilidža, HK Jahorina in Pale, and HK Šampion in Sarajevo. Each team played 16 games before the top two teams entered into a three game playoff.

The formation of the four team league also allowed the Bosnia and Herzegovina Ice Hockey Federation to meet the prerequisite of entering the Ice Hockey World Championships.

Following the end of the season two of the newly formed clubs, HK Jahorina and HK Šampion, folded causing the 2003–04 season to be cancelled and the Bosnia and Herzegovina Hockey League to go into a six year hiatus until the 2009–10 season.

Regular season standings

Playoffs
HK Bosna and HK Ilidža 2010 qualified for the playoffs after finishing first and second in the regular season standings respectively. HK Bosna won the best of three playoff series in two games.

References

Bosnia and Herzegovina Hockey League seasons
Bos
2002–03 in Bosnia and Herzegovina ice hockey